Moustapha Elhadji Cissé (born 14 September 2003) is a Guinean professional footballer who plays as a forward for  club Südtirol, on loan from Atalanta.

Club career

Rinascita Refugees
Cissé moved to Italy as a refugee and orphan and was scouted playing for Seconda Categoria club Rinascita Refugees in 2019, a team made of refugees and asylum seekers in Lecce in the eighth tier of Italian football. Whilst at Rinascita Refugees, Cissé scored 18 goals in eight league games for the club.

Atalanta
On 23 February 2022, Cissé signed for Atalanta. He debuted with their reserves in March 2022, scoring three goals in three games. Cissé made his Serie A debut with Atalanta in a 1–0 win over Bologna; coming on as a substitute in the 65th minute, he scored his side's only goal in the 82nd minute.

Loans in Serie B
On 5 August 2022, Cissé joined Serie B side Pisa on loan with an option to buy. He subsequently made his debut for the club the following day, starting in a 1–4 Coppa Italia defeat to Brescia.

Having found limited playing time in Tuscany, on 30 January 2023 Cissé was recalled from Pisa by Atalanta, subsequently joining fellow second-tier club Südtirol on loan until the end of the season.

Career statistics

Club

References

External links
 
 Footballdatabase Profile

2003 births
Living people
Sportspeople from Conakry
Guinean footballers
Association football forwards
Atalanta B.C. players
Pisa S.C. players
F.C. Südtirol players
Serie A players
Serie B players
Guinean emigrants to Italy
Guinean expatriate footballers
Guinean expatriate sportspeople in Italy
Expatriate footballers in Italy